Colégio Brasil (Brazil College) is a children's telenovela created and written by Yoya Wursch, originally transmitted on SBT from May 6, 1996 to September 20, 1996.

Cast

References

External links

1996 telenovelas
1996 Brazilian television series debuts
1996 Brazilian television series endings
Brazilian telenovelas
Sistema Brasileiro de Televisão telenovelas
Television shows set in São Paulo
Children's telenovelas
Portuguese-language telenovelas